Atriplex vesicaria, commonly known as bladder saltbush, is a species of flowering plant of the family Amaranthaceae and is endemic to arid and semi-arid inland regions of Australia. It is an upright or sprawling shrub with scaly leaves and separate male and female plants, the fruit often with a bladder-like appendage.

Description
The edges of the leaves are entire, occasionally toothed, with the leaf tips pointed or blunt.

Male and female flowers are usually borne on separate plants. Female flowers are borne in clusters of two to many in upper leaf axils and lack a perianth, the ovary surrounded by two bracteoles.

Taxonomy
Atriplex vesicaria was first formally described in 1870 by George Bentham in Flora Australiensis from an unpublished manuscript by Robert Heward. The specific epithet (vesicaria) means "bladder-like" or "inflated", referring to the appendages on the fruiting bodies. The name 'Atriplex' is from the Latin atriplexum, meaning orache, a plant used as a spinach substitute.

In 1938, Paul Aellen described Pachypharynx neglecta in Botanische Jahrbücher für Systematik, Pflanzengeschichte und Pflanzengeographie, but the name is considered a synonym by the Australian Plant Census.

In 1984, Geoffrey A. Parr-Smith described eight subspecies of A. vesicaria in the Flora of Australia and the names are accepted by the Australian Plant Census:
 Atriplex vesicaria subsp. appendiculata (Benth.) Parr-Sm.
 Atriplex vesicaria subsp. calcicola Parr-Sm.
 Atriplex vesicaria subsp. incompta Parr-Sm.
 Atriplex vesicaria subsp. macrocystidia Parr-Sm.
 Atriplex vesicaria subsp. minor (Aellen) Parr-Sm.
 Atriplex vesicaria subsp. sphaerocarpa Parr-Sm.
 Atriplex vesicaria subsp. variabilis Parr-Sm.
 Atriplex vesicaria Heward ex Benth.subsp. vesicaria

Distribution and habitat
Atriplex vesicaria is a widespread shrub that occurs across chenopod shrublands in arid and semi-arid inland areas across southern Australia, in Western Australia, Northern Territory, South Australia, Queensland, New South Wales, and Victoria. This species grows on alluvial plains, coastal dunes, salt pans, salt lakes, sandy plains and limestone ridges. 

In New South Wales, A. vesicaria occurs over clay soils on the Riverine Plains in the west, stony soils in the north west, and on texture-contrast soils in the south west. In Victoria, A. vesicaria occurs in the Lowan Mallee, Murray Mallee, Victorian Volcanic Plain, Murray Scroll Belt, and the Robinvale Plains.

Ecology and reproduction 
Bladder saltbush is relatively long-lived, with a 25-30 year lifespan. Over large areas, it can occur as the sole shrub species or as a co-dominant shrub with other perennial shrubs.

Although hermaphroditic variations with bisexual flowers have been recorded, the A. vesicaria is predominantly dioecious, with male and female flowers occurring on separate plants. Male flowers appear continuously or interrupted in clusters on thin, simple or branched terminal spikes or panicles. Female flowers are axillary, occurring solitary or in clusters of two or more in the leaf axils. The fruiting body is 6-15 millimetres in diameter, green to cream coloured, mostly orbicular and membranous, with fine veins networked throughout and concealed by inflated spongy appendages, with seeds held between bracts.

This species is halophytic, able to withstand salty soils, and is adapted to dry environments. In dry conditions, this plant will shed its leaves to retain moisture.

In favourable conditions, particularly after rainfall, recruitment occurs opportunistically. Flowering and seed set-in can occur several times a year. Male and female flowers are carried on separate plants: however, some plants are bisexual. A vesicaria can alter its sexual state from one season to the next, with sexual expression occurring in response to weather, light intensity, temperature, soil fertility and moisture, disease, age, injury and grazing intensity, and population density.

Conservation status
Atriplex vesicaria is not currently listed under the IUCN, however it is listed as "not threatened" by the Western Australia Department of Biodiversity, Conservation and Attractions. A paper published in 1989 suggested that recovery of the species from saltbush dieback may be attributed to mismanagement of some stands.

Uses

Indigenous 
Indigenous Australians have traditionally used the seeds and leaves of Saltbush, typically the species, Atriplex nummularia, commonly known as Old Man, Bluegreen or Giant Saltbush. The seeds are ground and used in damper, and the leaves are sometimes eaten fresh or added to meat.

Agricultural 
Atriplex vesicaria is of agricultural importance for livestock grazing, predominantly sheep grazing; however, the female plants are preferentially grazed over male plants that are not as palatable due to a chemical deterrent. Studies have shown that sex ratios are altered under the cumulative effects of preferential grazing. The species is sensitive to grazing pressures and can experience heavy defoliation in periods of low rainfall when other perennial shrubs are unavailable. Known for its drought and saline tolerance, the presence of this species is also considered a reliable indicator of pasture conditions.

Food 
Saltbush is currently considered somewhat of a delicacy and used in modern cuisine. It is known for its salty, earthy, herbal flavour and can be added to meat and vegetable dishes or used as a salt substitute.

Image gallery

See also
Soil-Surface Characteristics, Microtopography and Proximity to Mature Shrubs: Effects on Survival of Several Cohorts of Atriplex Vesicaria Seedlings

Survival of saltbush (Atriplex vesicaria) seedlings in heavily grazed experimental plots

Low seed availability may limit recruitment in grazed Atriplex vesicaria and contribute to its local extinction

References

vesicaria
Endemic flora of Australia
Caryophyllales of Australia
Flora of New South Wales
Flora of the Northern Territory
Flora of Queensland
Flora of South Australia
Flora of Victoria (Australia)
Eudicots of Western Australia
Plants described in 1870